Frontal Assault is the third album by British heavy metal band Angel Witch. The album was released in 1986 through Killerwatt Records.

Track listing
All songs written by Kevin Heybourne except "Dream World" by S. Heybourne and Kevin Heybourne and "Religion (Born Again)" and "Take to the Wing" by David Tattum and Kevin Heybourne.

A US promotional copy was released the same year by JCI Records, however, it only featured five tracks from Frontal Assault and other five from Screamin' 'n' Bleedin'. It also featured a different cover art.

Personnel
Angel Witch
David Tattum - lead vocals
Kevin Heybourne - guitars, backing vocals
Peter Gordelier - bass, backing vocals
Spencer Hollman - drums, backing vocals

Production
Les Hunt - producer, engineer
Eddie Stevens - executive producer

References

1986 albums
Angel Witch albums